The Illustrated Police News (ca. 1860–1904) or the Police News was a weekly periodical published in Boston, Massachusetts. In a popular, sensationalist syle it reported news of crime and legal proceedings with stories about, for instance, Billy the Kid and Bat Masterson. Editors or owners included John Stetson and A. H. Millett.

References

External links
Picture of the cover of the Easter 1896 edition in the NYPL Digital Gallery
Ink from a Circus Press Agent: Part two, 1885 on the Circus History Society website
19th Century Mormon Article Newspaper Index at the Harold E. Lee Library of Brigham Young University
The Illustrated Police News, Law Courts and Weekly Record on WorldCat
The Illustrated Police News, Law-Courts, and Weekly Record fulltext issues at the Digital Library of Villanova University. 

1860s establishments in Massachusetts
19th century in Boston
Weekly magazines published in the United States
Defunct magazines published in the United States
Magazines established in 1860
Magazines disestablished in 1904
Magazines published in Boston